The 2011 BWF World Championships was the 19th tournament of the World Badminton Championships, a global tournament in the sport of badminton. It was held at Wembley Arena in London, England, from August 8 to August 14, 2011.

China clean swept all the titles for a record third time and became the first nation to successfully defend all the titles won from the previous edition. Scotland won their first medal from mixed pair and India won their medal in women's doubles and their seconds worlds medal after 28 years.

Draw
The draw was held on 25 July at Kuala Lumpur, Malaysia.

Schedule
All five events started on the first day and concluded with the final on the last day.

All times are local (UTC+1).

Medalists

Medal table

Events

Participating countries
347 players from 48 countries participated at this year's edition. The number in parentheses indicate the player contributed by each country.

 (4)
 (4)
 (2)
 (8)
 (2)
 (4)
 (10)
 (24)
 (14)
 (3)
 (2)
 (16)
 (18)
 (2)
 (7)
 (12)
 (1)
 (8)
 India (12)
 (24)
 (4)
 (1)
 (1)
 (24)
 (1)
 (15)
 (3)
 (1)
 (14)
 (1)
 (3)
 (8)
 (11)
 (5)
 (9)
 (1)
 (1)
 (5)
 (13)
 (4)
 (2)
 (5)
 (3)
 (10)
 (4)
 (8)
 (9)
 (1)

References

External links

2011 BWF World Championships at bwfbadminton.org
BWF World Championships 2011 at tournamentsoftware.com

 
World Championships
BWF World Championships
Sport in the London Borough of Brent
Bwf World Championships
Bwf World Championships
BWF World Championships
BWF World Championships
London Prepares series
Badminton tournaments in England